Neeraj George, also known as Neeraj George Baby, is an Indian mountaineer and Para-Badminton athlete from Aluva, Kerala. George climbed Kilimanjaro on crutches. Working as an employee in Advocate General office Kerala, George participated in many national and international Para-Badminton tournaments.

References 

Living people
Sportspeople with limb difference
Indian male badminton players
Year of birth missing (living people)